π Geminorum (Latinised as Pi Geminorum, abbreviated to π Gem or pi Gem) is a star located in the constellation Gemini, to the north of Castor. With an apparent visual magnitude of 5.14, it is faintly visible to the naked eye on a dark night. Based upon an annual parallax|shift of 4.93 mas, Pi Geminorum is located roughly 660 light years from the Sun. At that distance, the visual magnitude of the star is diminished by an interstellar absorption factor of 0.033 due to interstellar dust.

This is an evolved red giant star with a stellar classification of M1 IIIa. At the estimated distance of this star, this yields a physical size of about 56 times the radius of the Sun. It is radiating roughly a thousand times the luminosity of the Sun from its outer atmosphere at an effective temperature of 3,900 K.

Unexpectedly for a red giant, Pi Geminorum was found to be an X-ray source during the ROSAT all-sky survey. The most likely source for this emission is an 11.4 magnitude companion star located at an angular separation of 21 arcseconds along a position angle of 214°. This star is suspected to be an astrometric companion of the primary component.

References

Geminorum, Pi
Suspected variables
Gemini (constellation)
Geminorum, Pi
Durchmusterung objects
Geminorum, 80
062898
038016
3013